Myriopteris fendleri, formerly known as Cheilanthes fendleri, is a species of fern in the Pteridaceae family (subfamily Cheilanthoideae) with the common name Fendler's lip fern. It is native to the southwest United States and northern Mexico.

Description
Myriopteris fendleri is a small fern growing from a wandering rhizome. The leaves are about 6 to 12 inches long and about 2 inches wide and are glabrous on the adaxial (top) surface. There are brown scales without cilia on the costae (pinna midribs).

Range and habitat
Myriopteris fendleri is native to the southwestern United States and northern Mexico, and ranges as far north as Colorado. It prefers north facing slopes with some shade, but can be found among rocks elsewhere.

Taxonomy
Based on plastid DNA sequence analysis, Myriopteris fendleri is very closely related to ''Myriopteris wootonii.

References

Works cited

fendleri